Clairvillia biguttata is a species of fly in the family Tachinidae.

Description
The thorax is shining black. Also the abdomen is mainly black, but the first three tergites are reddish with a black longitudinal stripe. Males show erect hairs on the dorsal surface of abdominal tergites three and four. These flies are parasites of Coriomeris denticulatus (Coreidae).

Distribution
This species can be found in Albania, Austria, Belgium, Bulgaria, Croatia, Czech Republic, France, Germany, Greece, Hungary, Italy, North Macedonia, Poland, Portugal, Romania, Russia, Spain, Switzerland.

References
Biolib
Fauna Europaea
 Keys to The Insects of The European Part of The USSR, Volume 5 1989 - Nature
Biostor.org

Phasiinae
Diptera of Europe
Diptera of North America
Insects described in 1824